Hypsirhynchus is a genus of snakes of the subfamily Dipsadinae. found on Jamaica, Hispaniola (Haiti and the Dominican Republic), and the Bahamas.

Species
 Hypsirhynchus ater (Gosse, 1851) - Jamaican giant racer, Jamaican racer
 Hypsirhynchus callilaemus (Gosse, 1851) - Jamaican red racer, Jamaican red racerlet, Jamaican red ground snake
 Hypsirhynchus ferox Günther, 1858 - Hispaniolan hog-nosed racer, Hispaniola cat-eyed snake
 Hypsirhynchus funereus (Cope, 1862) - Jamaican black racer, Jamaican black racerlet, Jamaican black ground snake
 Hypsirhynchus melanichnus (Cope, 1862) - Hispaniolan olive racer, La Vega racer
 Hypsirhynchus parvifrons (Cope, 1862) - common Hispaniolan racer, Cope's Antilles snake, Hispaniolan black racer 
 Hypsirhynchus polylepis (Buden, 1966) - Jamaican long-tailed racer, Jamaican long-tailed ground snake
 Hypsirhynchus scalaris Cope, 1863 - Tiburon hog-nosed racer

References

Snake genera
Hypsirhynchus
Reptiles of the Dominican Republic
Reptiles of Haiti
Reptiles of Jamaica
Reptiles of the Bahamas
Snakes of the Caribbean
Taxa named by Albert Günther